Joseph, Joe or Jo Walton may refer to:

Sportspeople
Joseph Walton (footballer) (1868–1940), English association footballer of the 1890s
Joe Walton (1935–2021), coach in college and professional American football
Joe Walton (footballer, born 1881) (1881–1962), English association footballer of the 1900s (Preston North End, Tottenham Hotspur, Sheffield United)
Joe Walton (footballer, born 1882) (1882–1954), English association footballer of the 1900s (New Brompton, Chelsea, Barry, Swansea Town)
Joe Walton (footballer, born 1925) (1925–2006), English association footballer

Writers
Jo Walton (born 1964), Canadian-Welsh novelist and poet
Jo L. Walton (born 1982), British poet and novelist

Others
Joseph Walton (convict) (1830–?), convict transported to Western Australia
Sir Joseph Walton, 1st Baronet (1849–1923), Liberal Party MP for Barnsley, 1897–1922
Joseph Walton (judge), English judge
Joseph Walton (British Army officer) (died 1808), Master Gunner, St. James's Park
 pseudonym for the American film director Joseph Losey